Percnidae is a family of crabs in the superfamily Grapsoidea. Percnidae contains about six described species in one genus: Percnon (Gistel, 1848).

References

Further reading

 
 
 
 

Grapsoidea
Decapod families
Monogeneric crustacean families